Aileen Marson (13 September 1912 – 4 May 1939) was a British stage and film actress. Born in Egypt where her father was a consular official with the diplomatic service, she travelled extensively due to her father's job (including a stay in Bucharest) and spoke five languages including Arabic. She came to England with her family when she was 13. Winning a scholarship to the Royal Academy of Dramatic Art, she appeared in regional and West End plays, (including mounting her own productions), and also starred in a number of leading roles in British films. She toured South Africa with Seymour Hicks where she met her husband, Jack Scott, a Johannesburg businessman, who she married in 1937. She died at the age of 26 in a London nursing home less than a day after giving birth to twins - a boy and a girl.

Filmography
 The Green Pack (1934)
 Road House (1934)
 Lucky Loser (1934)
 Passing Shadows (1934)
 My Song for You (1934)
 The Way of Youth (1934)
 Ten Minute Alibi (1935)
 Honeymoon for Three (1935)
 Royal Cavalcade (1935)
 The Black Mask (1935)
 Living Dangerously (1936)
 Someone at the Door (1936)
 The Limping Man (1936)
 The Tenth Man (1936)
 The Green Cockatoo (1937)
 Spring Handicap (1937)

References

Bibliography
 Shafer, Stephen C. British Popular 1929-1939: The Cinema of Reassurance. Routledge, 1997.
 Sutton, David R. A Chorus of Raspberries: British Film Comedy 1929-1939. University of Exeter Press, 2000.

External links

1912 births
1939 deaths
British film actresses
British stage actresses
20th-century British actresses
Deaths in childbirth
British expatriates in Egypt